The white-collared oliveback (Nesocharis ansorgei) is a species of estrildid finch found in Africa. It has an estimated global extent of occurrence of 94,000 km2.

It could be found at Burundi, The Democratic Republic of the Congo, Rwanda, Tanzania & Uganda. However, it is not commonly seen in at least parts of its range. The IUCN has classified the species as being of least concern.

References

External links
BirdLife International species factsheet

white-collared oliveback
Birds of Central Africa
white-collared oliveback